Neidalia bifasciata is a moth of the family Erebidae first described by Pieter Cramer in 1779. It is found in Suriname.

References

Phaegopterina
Moths described in 1779